The Friends at the Margherita Cafe (also known as The Friends of Bar Margherita) is a 2009 Italian comedy-drama film directed by Pupi Avati.

Plot summary 
Bologna, 1954. In the Margherita Cafè the young Taddeo meets a group of strange characters, led by the old Al. Al is a man who likes pretty girls, and soon Taddeo gets hired as his driver to take him to brave nights. While consume the stories of the other characters, who regularly go at the bar Margherita every day, Taddeo meets a beautiful librarian of his own age, and plans to marry her. However, the ambitions of the young Taddeo are too hasty, and so the fate repays him with a bad joke.

Cast 

 Diego Abatantuono: Al
 Neri Marcorè: Bep
 Laura Chiatti: Marcella
 Fabio De Luigi: Gian
 Luigi Lo Cascio: Manuelo
 Pierpaolo Zizzi: Taddeo
 Luisa Ranieri: Ninni
 Claudio Botosso: Zanchi
 Katia Ricciarelli: Mother of Taddeo
 Gianni Cavina: Grandpa Carlo
 Gianni Ippoliti: Sarti

References

External links

2009 films
Italian comedy-drama films
2009 comedy-drama films
Films directed by Pupi Avati
Films set in Emilia-Romagna
Films set in 1954
2000s Italian films